Meredith May Blackwell (born 1940) is an American mycologist, known as one of the world's leading experts on fungi associated with arthropods.

Education and career
Meredith Blackwell graduated in 1961 with B.S. in biology from the University of Southwestern Louisiana, Lafayette and in 1963 with M.S. in biology from the University of Alabama in Tuscaloosa. She graduated in 1973 with Ph.D. in botany from the University of Texas at Austin with thesis "A Developmental and Taxonomic Study of Protophysarum phloiogenum" under the supervision of C. J. Alexopoulos.

At the University of Florida, Blackwell was an electron microscopist from 1972 to 1974 and an assistant in botany from 1974 to 1975. She was an assistant professor at Hope College from 1975 to 1981. At Louisiana State University, she was an associate professor of botany from 1981 to 1985, a full professor of botany from 1998 to 1997, and Boyd Professor in the Department of Biological Sciences from 1997 to 2014, when she retired as Boyd Professor Emeritus. Since 2014 she has been an adjunct professor at the University of South Carolina in Columbia.

She was president of the Mycological Society of America from 1992 to 1993 and president of the International Mycological Association from 1998 to 2002. She served as an editor for Molecular Phylogenetics and Evolution (1992–1999), Mycologia (1995–1997), Journal of African Mycology and Biotechnology (1998–2006), and Systematics and Geography of Plants (1999–2006).

Blackwell is the co-editor of four books and the author or co-author of numerous scientific articles on such topics as termite-associated fungi, earwig-associated fungi, fungal infections of trees, molecular phylogeny of fungi, beetle-associated yeasts, and fungal evolution and taxonomy.

Awards and honors
 1983 — Alexopoulos Prize of the Mycological Society of America
 1996 — Centenary Fellow of the British Mycological Society
 1998 — Fellow of the American Association for the Advancement of Science
 2007 — Fellow of the Mycological Society of America
 2012 — Fellow of the American Academy of Arts and Sciences
 2014 — Fellow of the International Mycological Association
 2014 — De Bary Medal for life achievement from the International Mycological Association
 2018 — Festschrift in Honor of Meredith Blackwell published in Mycologia

Eponyms

Genera
Blackwellomyces
Meredithblackwellia  (type of Fungi) - Mycologia Vol.105 (Issue 2) on page 490 in 2013.
Meredithiella  (type of Fungi) - Fungal Biology Vol.119 (Issue 11) on page 1086 in 2015.

Species
Cadophora meredithiae
Cordyceps blackwelliae
Diphymyces blackwelliae
Ganoderma meredithiae
Kodamaea meredithiae
Prolixandromyces blackwelliae
Septobasidium meredithiae

References

External links
MycoBank search on "blackwell"

1940 births
Living people
American mycologists
Women mycologists
University of Louisiana at Lafayette alumni
University of Alabama alumni
University of Texas at Austin College of Natural Sciences alumni
Hope College faculty
Louisiana State University faculty
University of Florida faculty
University of South Carolina faculty